John Murray (February 1837 – 7 November 1911) was a British Army soldier and an Irish recipient of the Victoria Cross, the highest award for gallantry in the face of the enemy that can be awarded to British and Commonwealth forces.

Early life
Murray was born in Birr, County Offaly, in February 1837.

Victoria Cross
He was approximately 27 years old, and a sergeant in the 68th (Durham) Regiment of Foot (Light Infantry) during the Waikato-Hauhau Maori War in New Zealand when the following deed took place on 21 June 1864 at Tauranga for which he was awarded the VC:

Further information
Murray died at Derrinlogh in County Offaly on 7 November 1911.

The medal
His Victoria Cross is displayed at the Durham Light Infantry Museum & Durham Art Gallery in Durham, England.

References

External links
Location of grave and VC medal (Co. Offaly, Ireland)
DLI Biography

Irish recipients of the Victoria Cross
Durham Light Infantry soldiers
British military personnel of the New Zealand Wars
New Zealand Wars recipients of the Victoria Cross
1837 births
1911 deaths
19th-century Irish people
Irish soldiers in the British Army
People from Birr, County Offaly
British Army personnel of the Crimean War
British Army recipients of the Victoria Cross